S'lp is a historical village in the municipality of Kičevo, North Macedonia. It used to be part of the former Drugovo Municipality.The village of Sop was located on the Demir-Hisar side below the Turla pass. There were about 80 houses from Sop. Men spoke Albanian at home, while outside the village they used Albanian, Turkish and Macedonian. They had a lot of livestock and were regularly spahis in other villages.

History
The "Battle of Sop"

In 1844, during the uprising of Dervish Cara, the Albanians of Kerçova also rebelled and took the fortress of Kerçova. For this reason, Hajradin Pasha with 5 battalions left the city of Manastir for Kercove. The Albanian insurgents (whose number is unknown) set up a trap in the village of Sop where a great battle took place and is known as the "Battle of Sop" which resulted in the victory of the Albanian insurgents. The defeated Hajradin Pasha returned to Manastir but with 96 Albanian captives. This is proven by the report of the French Consul Grie to Minister François Guizot, who says: "Today in Thessaloniki, 96 chained Albanians came to Thessaloniki, who were captured near Sopi where Hajradin Pasha fought a battle against the Albanian insurgents".

The end of the village 

During the Balkan Wars, They were expelled from this area by the Serbian army transferred from Prilep and the Poreč Chetnik group. In retaliation for 1913 uprising, they set fire to Muslim village Sop . 73 Albanians of Sop were killed by Serbian soldiers. The village was razed to the ground, and its land reallocated to neighboring settlements.

Demographics
In statistics gathered by Vasil Kanchov in 1900, the village of S'lp was inhabited by 220 Muslim Albanians.

References

Villages in Kičevo Municipality
Albanian communities in North Macedonia